Burgiss Allison (1753–1827) was the Chaplain of the United States House of Representatives from 1816 to 1820 and a trustee of what is now George Washington University from 1821 to 1826.

Allison was born in Bordentown, New Jersey.  He studied at Brown University.  He became a Baptist minister.  He also worked on developing improvements to the steam engine.

Allison also wrote a dictionary, The American Standard of Orthography and Pronunciation, and Improved Dictionary of the English Language, Abridged for the Use of Schools (1815). He was elected to the American Philosophical Society in 1789.

References

External links
George Washington University library bio of Allison 
https://history.house.gov/People/Detail/38335

1753 births
Baptists from New Hampshire
Brown University alumni
Chaplains of the United States House of Representatives
George Washington University trustees
1827 deaths
People from Bordentown, New Jersey
19th-century Baptist ministers from the United States
Baptists from New Jersey